Armstrong railway station is located in the town of Armstrong, Ontario, Canada. This station is currently in use by Via Rail. Transcontinental Canadian trains stop here.

External links
 Armstrong railway station

Via Rail stations in Ontario
Railway stations in Thunder Bay District
Canadian National Railway stations in Ontario